Disney Channel (on-air known as Disney Csatorna) is a British-managed Hungarian pay television channel owned and operated by The Walt Disney Company Limited. It is aimed at children and teens. It used to be known as Fox Kids, and later as Jetix.

The channel is broadcast in Hungary, the Czech Republic, and Slovakia, the two latter receiving it with a Czech audio track.

History
The channel was launched in Hungary in November 2000 as Fox Kids. One year later, it increased its coverage area to the Czech Republic and Slovakia with the addition of a Czech audio track to the channel. On 18 April 2004, Fox Kids launched Jetix as a programming block, and later, on 1 January 2005, the channel was rebranded as Jetix.

On 11 August 2008, Jetix started broadcasting a block of "Disney stars", featuring the series Kim Possible, Phineas and Ferb, American Dragon, Hannah Montana and later Wizards of Waverly Place. After Disney XD was launched on 19 February 2009 in the US, the Disney-ABC Television Group has started re-branding Jetix channels in all countries. However, in certain countries (including Hungary), Jetix was replaced by Disney Channel, marking that channel's introduction in these countries.

On 8 July 2009, Jetix started broadcasting promotional ads that announced the launch of Disney Channel in Hungary with the series Phineas and Ferb, Hannah Montana, JONAS, Kim Possible, American Dragon and Wizards of Waverly Place. Thus, Jetix was rebranded as Disney Channel on 19 September 2009.

On 21 July 2014, the channel adopted the new logo. The channel switched to 16:9 widescreen on 29 January 2015.

On 3 May 2011, Disney Channel Central Europe started using the same and updated on-air logo as in the United States, along with several other Disney Channels across Europe, completing its transitional rebrand to the new look. The new logo has debuted on the Czech feed first, prior to appearing on the UK, German, French, Dutch and Spanish feeds. The Playhouse Disney programming block was rebranded to Disney Junior in the Czech Republic and Slovakia on June 1, 2011.

Since 2012, most of the channel's promos are being produced in widescreen. In December 2012, Disney Channel Central Europe has adapted the same on-air presentation and graphics, with minor differences, used by Disney Channel UK. This update has been fully complete in spring.

In June 2014, Disney Channel Central Europe adapted the new logo currently used by Disney Channel Germany. It started broadcasting in 16:9 widescreen format from 29 January 2015.

On July 1, 2015, Disney Junior launched in Hungary, but closed on December 5, 2017.

Current programming

Live-action 
 Bunk'd
 Raven's Home
 Secrets of Sulphur Springs
 The Mysterious Benedict Society
 The Villains of Valley View

Animated
 Miraculous: Tales of Ladybug and Cat Noir
 Big City Greens
 Boy Girl Dog Cat Mouse Cheese
 Ghostforce
 The Ghost and Molly McGee
 Vikingskool
 The Unstoppable Yellow Yeti
 Chip 'n' Dale: Park Life
 50/50 Heroes
 Droners

Former programming

Live-action 
 K-9
 Wizards of Waverly Place
 Zeke and Luther
 I'm in the Band
 Aaron Stone
 Jake & Blake
 My Babysitter's a Vampire
 Hannah Montana
 Sonny with a Chance
 H2O: Just Add Water
 Jonas
 The Suite Life on Deck
 The Suite Life of Zack & Cody
 Shake It Up
 A.N.T. Farm
 Good Luck Charlie
 Disney's Win, Lose or Draw
 Art Attack
 Crash & Bernstein
 Violetta
 I Love Violetta
 Dog with a Blog
 Mighty Med
 Jessie
 Binny and the Ghost
 Pair of Kings
 Austin & Ally
 Wolfblood
 Spooksville
 Annedroids
 Violetta: Angie's kitchen
 Lab Rats
 Gamer's Guide to Pretty Much Everything
 Lab Rats: Elite Force
 K.C. Undercover
 Liv and Maddie
 Mako Mermaids
 Hank Zipzer
 I Didn't Do It
 Girl Meets World
 Evermoor
 Best Friends Whenever
 Alex & Co.
 Summer Break Diaries
 Stuck in the Middle
 Soy Luna
 Kickin' It
 Bizaardvark
 Bug Juice: My Adventures at Camp
 The Lodge
 O11CE
 Project Mc2
 Mech-X4
 Fast Layne
 Penny on M.A.R.S.
 Coop & Cami Ask the World
 Just Roll with It
 Gabby Duran & the Unsittables
 Kirby Buckets
 Bia
 Once
 Sydney to the Max

Animated
 Doc McStuffins(2013-2015) (Dub title: Dr. Plüssi)
 The Hive(2013-2015) (Dub title: Zümi kalandjai)
 Jake and the Never Land Pirates(2011-2015) (Dub title: Jake és Sohaország kalózai)
 Jungle Junction(2010-2015) (Dub title: Dzsungelélet)
 Mickey Mouse Clubhouse(2009-2015) (Dub title: Mickey éger játszótere)
 Mouk(2011-2015)
 Sofia the First(2013-2015) (Dub title: Szófia hercegnö)
 Monster Buster Club(September 19, 2009-2011)
 The Replacements(September 19, 2009-2012) (Dub title: Cserecsapat)
 The Emperor's New School(October 2009-2012) (Dub title: Király suli)
 Kim Possible(September 19, 2009-2014) (Dub title: Kis tini hös)
 Brandy & Mr. Whiskers(December 7, 2009-2010) (first season only) (Dub title: Brandy és Mr. Bajusz)
 Recess(September 19, 2009-2013) (Dub title: Szünet)
 Fish Hooks(2011-2014) (first 2 seasons only) (Dub title: Pecatanya)
 Lilo & Stitch: The Series
 The Fairly OddParents
 Stoked
 Kick Buttowski
 Kid vs. Kat
 American Dragon: Jake Long
 Timon and Pumbaa
 Sabrina: Secrets of a Teenage Witch
 Whisker Haven Tales with the Palace Pets
 Gravity Falls
 Cars Toons
 The Owl
 Brian O'Brian
 Have a Laugh!
 Toy Story Toons
 Lego Star Wars: The Resistance Rises
 Ultimate Spider-Man
 Boyster
 LEGO Frozen Northern Lights 
 Phineas and Ferb
 Penn Zero: Part-Time Hero
 Star Wars Rebels
 Descendants: Wicked World
 Counterfeit Cat
 Wander Over Yonder
 Camp Lakebottom
 Randy Cunningham: 9th Grade Ninja
 The 7D
 LoliRock
 Supa Strikas
 Rolling with the Ronks!
 Sunny Bunnies
 Sheriff Callie's Wild West 
 The ZhuZhus
 Star Darlings
 Miles from Tomorrowland
 The Lion Guard
 Lego Star Wars: The Freemaker Adventures
 Elena of Avalor
 Mickey and the Roadster Racers
 Star Wars: Forces of Destiny
 Spider-Man
 Puppy Dog Pals
 PJ Masks
 Star vs. the Forces of Evil
 Tangled: The Series
 Mickey Mouse
 Milo Murphy's Law
 Hotel Transylvania: The Series
 DuckTales
 Kitty Is Not A Cat
 Big Hero 6: The Series
 Star Wars Resistance
 101 Dalmatian Street
 Sadie Sparks
 Best Bugs Forever
 Supa Strikas
 Amphibia
 Zombies: Addison's Moonstone Mystery

Jetix
 Winx Club (seasons 1–2 only)

Logos

References

External links
 Disney TV Magyarország

Hungary
Television channels and stations established in 2000
2000 establishments in Hungary
Television channels in Hungary